Sezin Akbaşoğulları (born 22 April 1981) is a Turkish actress.

She gained her first acting experience by joining her high school theatre team and was cast in the play Yine Başladılar Şarkılarına. She later graduated from Bilkent University with a degree in theatre studies. Her breakthrough came with her role in the 2005 series Beyaz Gelincik as Ceren Aslanbaş. She earned critical acclaim with her performance in the movie Kavşak, for she was awarded as the Best Actress together with Nergis Öztürk at the 17th International Adana Film Festival in 2010.

Filmography

Film

Television

Short film

Theatre

References

External links 
 
 

Living people
1981 births
Turkish stage actresses
Turkish television actresses
Turkish film actresses
Actresses from İzmir
Bilkent University alumni
Best Actress Golden Boll Award winners